Psychotic Reaction is the only studio album by the American garage rock band Count Five,  released in October 1966, through Double Shot Records DSS5001.

It features the hit single “Psychotic Reaction”, number five on the Billboard charts in October 1966, and The Who covers, “My Generation” and "Out in the Street".

Background 
Previously to recording sessions, Count Five was rejected by several record labels before they got signed to the Los Angeles-based Double Shot Records in 1965. Double Shot was an independent label (active 1965-1972) owned by Harold "Hal" Winn and Joseph "Joe" Hooven, who were also songwriters and record producers.

The song "Psychotic Reaction" was released as a single, peaking at number 5 in the U.S. charts in late 1966, after its release in July 1966. To capitalize on the success of the single, Winn and Hooven  at Double Shot immediately pressured the band to record a full-length album.

The songs' lyrics were written mostly by John "Sean" Byrne, and the music and vocals were recorded in a very short time, so deliberately included two covers of The Who band as filler songs, to complete a brief album of eleven tracks. Band members complained in later interviews that due to the hurried nature of the recording sessions, they never had the chance to shape the songs the way they wanted them to sound. The style of the album is fairly basic but effective, set to the rhythms and ways of garage rock.

Reception 
With a low budget production and insufficient marketing, Psychotic Reaction peaked at number 122 on the Billboard 200. Other singles, released between 1966 and 1969, sold poorly and did not chart (some not included in the original LP).

The band enjoyed limited success for a short time, dropping out of view altogether when their only hit had fallen from public memory. Accordingly, Count Five had to break up in 1969, so its members could pursue college educations.

Track listing 
All songs written by John Byrne, except where noted.

 "Double-Decker Bus" – 2:00
 "Pretty Big Mouth" (Byrne/Kenn Ellner/Roy Chaney/Craig Atkinson/Mouse Michalski) – 2:07
 "The World" – 2:12
 "My Generation" (Pete Townshend) – 2:27
 "She's Fine" – 2:12
 "Psychotic Reaction" (Ellner/Chaney/Atkinson/Byrne/Michalski) – 3:03
 "Peace of Mind" (Byrne/Chaney/Michalski) – 2:19
 "They're Gonna Get You" – 2:26
 "The Morning After" – 1:57
 "Can't Get Your Lovin'" - 1:47
 "Out in the Street" (Townshend) – 2:28

Bonus tracks (only CD release) 
 "Teeny Bopper, Teeny Bopper" (Ellner/Chaney/Atkinson/Byrne/Michalski) – 2:22
 "You Must Believe Me" (Curtis Mayfield) – 2:58
 "Contrast" – 3:51
 "Merry-Go-Round" – 2:37
 "Declaration of Independence" (Ellner/Chaney/Atkinson/Byrne/Michalski) – 2:20
 "Revelation in Slow Motion" (Patrick Briley) – 1:57
 "Mailman" (Mighty Mo Rodgers/Winn) – 2:22

Personnel

Musicians 
 John "Sean" Byrne - lead vocals, rhythm guitar
 Kenn Ellner – lead vocals (tracks 4, 8, and 11), tambourine, harmonica
 John "Mouse" Michalski – lead guitar
 Craig "Butch" Atkinson – drums
 Roy Chaney – bass guitar

Technical 
 Hal Winn – producer 
 Joseph Hooven – producer
 Sy Mitchell – engineer
 Bernard Yeszin – photography, design
 Irwin Zucker – promotions director

Charts

Albums

Singles

References

External links 
Psychotic Reaction at Discogs
Psychotic Reaction at AllMusic
 Psychotic Reaction review at Rising Storm

1966 albums
Count Five albums